Liaoning Chaoyang railway station is a station on Beijing–Shenyang high-speed railway and Chaoyang–Linghai high-speed railway. It is located in Longcheng District, Chaoyang, Liaoning Province, People's Republic of China.

References

Railway stations in Liaoning
Buildings and structures in Chaoyang, Liaoning
Stations on the Beijing–Harbin High-Speed Railway
Railway stations in China opened in 2018